North Caldwell is a borough in northwestern Essex County, in the U.S. state of New Jersey, and a suburb of New York City. As of the 2020 United States census, the borough's population was 6,694, an increase of 511 (+8.3%) from the 2010 census count of 6,183, which in turn reflected a decline of 1,192 (−16.2%) from the 7,375 counted in the 2000 census.

North Caldwell was incorporated by an act of the New Jersey Legislature on March 31, 1898, from portions of Caldwell Township (now known as Fairfield Township). The borough derives its name from Presbyterian minister James Caldwell.

New Jersey Monthly magazine ranked North Caldwell as its 10th best place to live in its 2010 rankings of the "Best Places To Live" in New Jersey, as well as the 3rd best place to live in its 2013 ranking. In 2017, a Bloomberg analysis ranked North Caldwell the 34th richest town in the United States.

History
North Caldwell was part of the Horseneck Tract, which was an area that consisted of what are now the municipalities of Caldwell, West Caldwell, North Caldwell, Fairfield, Verona, Cedar Grove, Essex Fells, Roseland, and portions of Livingston and West Orange. The explanation for the name "Horse Neck" lies in the language of its first Dutch settlers and not (as has been inaccurately reported) because of its irregular shape. This purchase encompassed much of western Essex County, from the First Mountain to the Passaic River.

In 1982, the borough was one of four Essex County municipalities to pass a referendum to become a township, joining 11 municipalities that had already made the change. Ultimately, more than a dozen Essex County municipalities reclassified themselves as townships in order take advantage of federal revenue sharing policies that allocated townships a greater share of government aid to municipalities on a per capita basis. Effective January 1, 1992, it again became a borough.

The borough housed the Essex County Penitentiary, constructed in 1872 and used as the Essex County Jail Annex until 2004. It was sold to K. Hovnanian Companies in 2002, which redeveloped the site into a residential community.

In 1994, the "Unabomber", Theodore Kaczynski, sent a mail bomb that killed Thomas J. Mosser, an advertising executive who lived in the borough.

Geography
According to the United States Census Bureau, the borough had a total area of 3.07 square miles (7.96 km2), including 3.07 square miles (7.95 km2) of land and 0.01 square miles (0.01 km2) of water (0.16%).

The borough is bordered by the municipalities of Caldwell, Cedar Grove, Essex Fells, Fairfield Township, Verona and West Caldwell in Essex County; and Little Falls and Wayne in Passaic County.

Demographics

2010 census

The Census Bureau's 2006–2010 American Community Survey showed that (in 2010 inflation-adjusted dollars) median household income was $151,953 (with a margin of error of +/− $28,824) and the median family income was $178,750 (+/− $38,265). Males had a median income of $140,729 (+/− $14,382) versus $74,750 (+/− $15,480) for females. The per capita income for the borough was $71,798 (+/− $8,574). About none of families and 2.4% of the population were below the poverty line, including none of those under age 18 and 3.9% of those age 65 or over.

2000 census
As of the 2000 United States census there were 7,375 people, 2,070 households, and 1,834 families residing in the borough. The population density was 2,464.6 people per square mile (952.3/km2). There were 2,108 housing units at an average density of 704.5 per square mile (272.2/km2). The racial makeup of the borough was 79.63% White, 14.51% African American, 0.03% Native American, 4.71% Asian, 0.26% from other races, and 0.87% from two or more races. Hispanic or Latino of any race were 2.16% of the population.

There were 2,070 households, out of which 42.0% had children under the age of 18 living with them, 80.5% were married couples living together, 5.9% had a female householder with no husband present, and 11.4% were non-families. 9.6% of all households were made up of individuals, and 4.8% had someone living alone who was 65 years of age or older. The average household size was 3.02 and the average family size was 3.23.

In the borough the population was spread out, with 23.1% under the age of 18, 8.7% from 18 to 24, 31.0% from 25 to 44, 26.4% from 45 to 64, and 10.9% who were 65 years of age or older. The median age was 37 years. For every 100 females, there were 118.5 males. For every 100 females age 18 and over, there were 124.2 males.

The median income for a household in the borough was $117,395, and the median income for a family was $125,465. Males had a median income of $87,902 versus $47,904 for females. The per capita income for the borough was $48,249. About 0.8% of families and 1.2% of the population were below the poverty line, including 2.4% of those under age 18 and none of those age 65 or over.

Government

Local government
North Caldwell is governed under the Borough form of New Jersey municipal government, which is used in 218 municipalities (of the 564) statewide, making it the most common form of government in New Jersey. The governing body is comprised of the Mayor and the Borough Council, with all positions elected at-large on a partisan basis as part of the November general election. The Mayor is elected directly by the voters to a four-year term of office. The Borough Council is comprised of six members elected to serve three-year terms on a staggered basis, with two seats coming up for election each year in a three-year cycle.

The borough form of government used by North Caldwell is a "weak mayor / strong council" government in which council members act as the legislative body with the mayor presiding at meetings and voting only in the event of a tie. The mayor can veto ordinances subject to an override by a two-thirds majority vote of the council. The mayor makes committee and liaison assignments for council members, and most appointments are made by the mayor with the advice and consent of the council.

, the Mayor of North Caldwell is Democrat Joshua H. Raymond, whose term of office ends December 31, 2026. Members of the Borough Council are Council President Anthony Floria-Callori (D, 2023), Matthew J. Atlas (D, 2023), Robert C. Kessler (R, 2024), Arthur J. Rees (D, 2025),  Kenneth Tilton (R, 2023; appointed to serve an unexpired term) and Stephen C. Weinstein (D, 2025).

In January 2023, the Borough Council appointed Kenneth Tilton to fill vacant seat expiring in December 2023 that had been held by Francis Astorino.

In October 2014, the borough council appointed Robert Kessler to fill the vacant seat of Patricia Fost.

Federal, state and county representation
North Caldwell is located in the 11th Congressional District and is part of New Jersey's 26th state legislative district. Prior to the 2011 reapportionment following the 2010 Census, North Caldwell had been in the 27th state legislative district.

Politics
As of March 2011, there were a total of 4,712 registered voters in North Caldwell, of which 1,123 (23.8%) were registered as Democrats, 1,591 (33.8%) were registered as Republicans and 1,994 (42.3%) were registered as Unaffiliated. There were 4 voters registered as Libertarians or Greens.

In the 2012 presidential election, Republican Mitt Romney received 61.1% of the vote (2,043 cast), ahead of Democrat Barack Obama with 37.5% (1,253 votes), and other candidates with 1.3% (45 votes), among the 3,361 ballots cast by the borough's 4,856 registered voters (20 ballots were spoiled), for a turnout of 69.2%. In the 2008 presidential election, Republican John McCain received 56.8% of the vote (2,047 cast), ahead of Democrat Barack Obama with 41.5% (1,495 votes) and other candidates with 0.7% (25 votes), among the 3,603 ballots cast by the borough's 4,704 registered voters, for a turnout of 76.6%. In the 2004 presidential election, Republican George W. Bush received 58.9% of the vote (2,137 ballots cast), outpolling Democrat John Kerry with 40.4% (1,465 votes) and other candidates with 0.3% (15 votes), among the 3,628 ballots cast by the borough's 4,502 registered voters, for a turnout percentage of 80.6.

In the 2013 gubernatorial election, Republican Chris Christie received 72.9% of the vote (1,446 cast), ahead of Democrat Barbara Buono with 26.1% (517 votes), and other candidates with 1.0% (20 votes), among the 2,012 ballots cast by the borough's 4,920 registered voters (29 ballots were spoiled), for a turnout of 40.9%. In the 2009 gubernatorial election, Republican Chris Christie received 60.6% of the vote (1,495 ballots cast), ahead of  Democrat Jon Corzine with 32.0% (789 votes), Independent Chris Daggett with 6.4% (157 votes) and other candidates with 0.3% (8 votes), among the 2,469 ballots cast by the borough's 4,695 registered voters, yielding a 52.6% turnout.

Education
The North Caldwell Public Schools serve students in pre-kindergarten through sixth grade. As of the 2018–19 school year, the district, comprised of two schools, had an enrollment of 672 students and 62.7 classroom teachers (on an FTE basis), for a student–teacher ratio of 10.7:1. Schools in the district (with 2018–19 enrollment data from the National Center for Education Statistics) are
Grandview School 391 students in grades Pre-K–3 and 
Gould School 276 students in grades 4–6. Gould / Mountain School was one of nine schools in New Jersey honored in 2020 by the National Blue Ribbon Schools Program, which recognizes high student achievement.

North Caldwell is home to the West Essex Regional School District, which also serves public school students from Fairfield, Essex Fells and Roseland in seventh through twelfth grades. Schools in the district (with 2018–19 enrollment data from the National Center for Education Statistics) are 
West Essex Middle School with 564 students in grades 7–8 and 
West Essex High School with 1,123 students in grades 9–12. Seats on the nine-member board of education of the high school district are allocated based on population, with three seats assigned to North Caldwell.

Transportation

Roads and highways

The main roads serving North Caldwell include County Route 527 and County Route 506.

Public transportation
NJ Transit provides bus service to Newark on the 29 route.

In popular culture
 In the HBO television show The Sopranos, the house used to portray the home of Tony Soprano and his family is located in North Caldwell. Many scenes from the show were filmed in North Caldwell and other communities in North Jersey.
 Stuckeyville, the fictional town in the NBC television series Ed, was modeled after North Caldwell.
 The 1994 film North included scenes which were filmed in North Caldwell.
 Sylvester Stallone filmed scenes from the movie Cop Land in 1997 at the Hilltop Reservations.
 Jermaine Jackson filmed the "Dynamite" music video in 1984 at the Essex County Jail Annex.

Notable people

People who were born in, residents of, or otherwise closely associated with North Caldwell include:

 Martin Brodeur (born 1972), former goalie for the New Jersey Devils
 Jane Burgio (1922–2005), politician who served as Secretary of State of New Jersey and as a member of the New Jersey General Assembly
 Rob Burnett (born 1962), producer, director, and writer, who is the executive producer of the Late Show with David Letterman and president and CEO of Worldwide Pants
 David Chase (born 1945), creator of The Sopranos
 Ken Daneyko (born 1964), former New Jersey Devils defenseman
 Julio M. Fuentes (born 1946), Senior United States circuit judge of the United States Court of Appeals for the Third Circuit, who is the first Hispanic judge to serve the Third Circuit
 Josh Gottheimer (born 1975), Congressman who represents New Jersey's 5th congressional district
 Wyclef Jean (born 1969), hip hop and R&B music artist
 Jamie Langenbrunner (born 1975), winger who played for the New Jersey Devils
* Veronica Miele Beard, fashion designer
 David Newsom (born 1962), producer, actor, and fine-arts photographer
 Joe Piscopo (born 1951), comedian and actor best known for his work on Saturday Night Live
 Barbara Rachelson, politician who has served in the Vermont House of Representatives since 2014
 Ronald T. Raines (born 1958), scientist, educator, and entrepreneur who was recognized with a Guggenheim Fellowship in 2001
 Frederic Remington (born 1929), politician who served in the New Jersey General Assembly from 1978 to 1992
 Josh Saviano (born 1976), actor who played the role of "Paul Pfeiffer" on The Wonder Years
 Ernestine Schumann-Heink (1861–1936), opera singer
 Johnny Sylvester (1915–1990), who as a young boy achieved national fame when Babe Ruth dedicated home runs to him in the 1926 World Series
 Thea White (1940–2021), voice actress best known for her work as Muriel Bagge in the animated TV show Courage the Cowardly Dog
 Richard Wilbur (1921–2017), poet, critic, and translator that won two Pulitzer Prizes and served as United States Poet Laureate
 Joe Yeninas (1934–2020), cartoonist and illustrator for the Newark Evening News, the Associated Press, and The Journal of Commerce

References

External links

 North Caldwell website
 North Caldwell Public Schools
 
 School Data for the North Caldwell Public Schools, National Center for Education Statistics
 West Essex Regional School District

 
1898 establishments in New Jersey
Borough form of New Jersey government
Boroughs in Essex County, New Jersey
Populated places established in 1898
The Caldwells, New Jersey